Sara Šenvald (born 14 March 1996) is a Croatian handballer for RK Podravka Koprivnica and the Croatian national team.

She represented Croatia at the 2022 European Women's Handball Championship.

References

1996 births
Living people
Croatian female handball players
Sportspeople from Koprivnica
Competitors at the 2022 Mediterranean Games
Mediterranean Games silver medalists for Croatia
Mediterranean Games medalists in handball
RK Podravka Koprivnica players
21st-century Croatian women